Highway 265 (AR 265, Ark. 265, Hwy. 265, and the Dick Trammel Highway) is a designation for three state highways in Northwest Arkansas. The southern segment of  runs from Highway 170 near Strickler north to I-49/US 71/Highway 112 in south Fayetteville. 
A second segment begins in east Fayetteville at Highway 16 and runs north through Springdale to Highway 94 in Rogers. Further north, a third segment of  runs from Highway 94 in Pea Ridge north to the Missouri state line. The highways are maintained by the Arkansas Department of Transportation (ARDOT).

Parts of all three segments are former lengths of the Butterfield Stagecoach Route, a route established in 1857 that carried United States mail from St. Louis, Missouri to San Francisco, California.

Route description

Strickler to Fayetteville
AR 265 begins in a rural part of southern Washington County within the Northwest Arkansas and Ozark Mountain regions. Starting at an intersection with AR 170, the highway runs near SEFOR, a deactivated experimental fast breeder reactor before passing through the unincorporated community of Strickler. Continuing north as a winding, two-lane highway, the highway passes near the headwaters of the Illinois River and serves as the western terminus of AR 156 at Hogeye. Upon entering Greenland, AR 265 intersects Wilson Street, which gives access to Interstate 49 (I-49). AR 265 continues north into Fayetteville, passing the Kessler Mountain Regional Park and beginning to parallel the Razorback Greenway. The route meets I-49 southbound and an unsigned AR 16. The route terminates at the I-49 on/off ramps, with the roadway continuing as AR 16.

Fayetteville to Springdale

The route begins again at AR 16 in southeast Fayetteville. The highway serves as the entrance to many communities, and is four-lane with center turn lane throughout Fayetteville. AR 265 intersects AR 45, Township Road, Joyce Blvd, Don Tyson Parkway, and US 412 before reaching the Springdale Municipal Airport. The route continues north, entering Benton County and intersecting AR 264 in Bethel Heights. Continuing north, Highway 265 passes through undeveloped areas of Bethel Heights and Lowell without any state highway junctions as a two-lane road with a two-way left turn lane to Rogers, where it terminates at AR 94 (New Hope Road).

Pea Ridge to Missouri
A third segment begins at AR 94 west of Pea Ridge and runs north to the Missouri state line before where it becomes Missouri Route KK.

History

Although not one of Arkansas' original state highways, the path that AR 265 follows is one of the state's oldest. Originally a Native American trace named the Great Osage Trail, the route was first used as a Military Road from St. Louis to Fort Smith, and later as the Trail of Tears. The Butterfield Overland Mail Route was active from 1857 to 1861 on the route. The route carried U.S. mail, and also carried telegraph lines west. Portions of the route are named Old Wire Road (also Old Missouri Road in Fayetteville) paying homage to the route's past. Although not all parts of AR 265 are the exact path followed by the stage coaches, nor are all parts of Old Wire Road separate of AR 265. This comes from the fact that there were many different alignments of the historic routes. Although there is no doubt about the southern segment's accuracy, AR 265 is known as Old Missouri Road (or Crossover Rd.) paralleled by Old Wire Road in Fayetteville, but it is not clear to the traveler which route is more historically accurate.

The Strickler to Fayetteville segment was designated in 1958. Another AR 265 was later designated as a connector between AR 16 and AR 45, with this route being extended to its current alignment in 1973. The northernmost segment was designated in 1973, and was most recently paved in 1990.

Major intersections

Related routes

Springdale spur

Highway 265 Spur was a spur route in Springdale.

Highway 383

Its southern terminus was Highway 68 (now known as U.S. Highway 412) with its northern terminus at Highway 68N (also known as Emma Avenue). It was used primarily as a local access road to nearby Parson's Arena.

In the 1980s, Highway 383 was redesignated as an extension of Highway 265.

See also

 List of state highways in Arkansas

References

External links

265
Transportation in Washington County, Arkansas
Transportation in Benton County, Arkansas
Butterfield Overland Mail
Trail of Tears